Wesley Katjiteo (born 17 February 1990) is a Namibian footballer who plays as an attacking midfielder for Black Africa and the Namibia national football team.

References

1990 births
Living people
Namibian men's footballers
People from Otjozondjupa Region
Association football midfielders
Black Africa S.C. players
TS Sporting F.C. players
Namibia international footballers
Namibia A' international footballers
2020 African Nations Championship players
Namibian expatriate sportspeople in South Africa
Namibian expatriate footballers
Expatriate soccer players in South Africa